Coli is a comune (municipality) in the Province of Piacenza in the Italian region Emilia-Romagna, located about  west of Bologna and about  southwest of Piacenza.

The municipality of Coli contains the frazione (subdivision) Aglio.

Coli borders the following municipalities: Bettola, Bobbio, Corte Brugnatella, Farini, Ferriere, Travo.

Demographic evolution

References

Cities and towns in Emilia-Romagna